Dobong (in Korean 도봉) may refer to:

Dobong District (도봉구, Dobong-gu), one of the 25 districts of Seoul, South Korea
Dobong Station, a metro station on Seoul Subway Line 1 north of Seoul that offers services connecting the city to the cities to the north in Gyeonggi-do
Mount Dobong, or Dobongsan, a mountain in Bukhansan National Park, South Korea

See also
Dobong-dong is a dong, a neighbourhood of Dobong-gu in Seoul, South Korea